Rock Lake is a lake located in Cass County, Minnesota, USA. A smaller lake branches from it, with a smaller stream flowing into it. 

Rock Lake is weedy and a habitat for Northern Pike and Large Mouth Bass. It is available for recreational activities such as swimming, boating and fishing.

References

Lakes of Cass County, Minnesota
Lakes of Minnesota